Fenwick is a small hamlet in the civil parish of Kyloe near Berwick-upon-Tweed and has a population of approx 400. Fenwick lies only three miles from Holy Island, Lindisfarne and the world-famous heritage coastline. Fenwick lies alongside St Cuthberts Way, on which the monk St Cuthbert made his passage through Fenwick to the Holy Island. Fenwick's location meant it saw its fair share of skirmishes during the border raids from Scots.

References

External links

Villages in Northumberland